Federal Route 201, or Jalan Nibong-Jakar-Bukit Nangka, is a federal road in Kelantan, Malaysia. The route connects town of Bukit Bunga in the west and Kampung Nibong in the east.

History  

In 2003, the highway was gazetted as Federal Route 201.

Features

At most sections, the Federal Route 201 was built under the JKR R5 road standard, allowing maximum speed limit of up to 90 km/h.

Major intersections 
The entire route is in Kelantan, Malaysia.

See also 
 List of highways numbered 201

References

External links 
 Malaysia Federal Route Map, Ministry of Works Malaysia

Malaysian Federal Roads